Fuel cell may refer to:
 Fuel cell, an electrochemical device
 Racing fuel cell, a gasoline tank with baffles that prevent sloshing typically found in a race vehicle, but also on some street vehicles. 
 Stanley Meyer's water fuel cell, a fraudulent device for allegedly powering a car from water
 An aircraft fuel tank (see Fuel tank#Aircraft)